James Elser is an American ecologist and limnologist.  He is Director & Bierman Professor of Ecology, Flathead Lake Biological Station, University of Montana and research professor, School of Life Sciences, Arizona State University.  He is known for his work in ecological stoichiometry.  In 2019, he was elected to the National Academy of Sciences.

Education 

Elser earned a B.S. in biology in 1981 from the University of Notre Dame and an M.S. in ecology in 1983 from the University of Tennessee.  He earned a Ph.D. in ecology at University of California-Davis in 1990 working with the limnologist Charles R. Goldman, producing a dissertation titled "Nutrients, algae, and grazers: complex interactions in lake ecosystems".

Career 

Elser was hired as an assistant professor at Arizona State University in 1990, where he advanced to Associate and Full Professor, and was named Regents' Professor in 2009.  In 2016 he moved to University of Montana, where he directs the Flathead Lake Biological Station, while remaining a research professor at Arizona State.  He served as president of the Association for the Sciences of Limnology and Oceanography from 2014 to 2016.

Research 

Elser's research focuses on ecological stoichiometry, how the balance of chemical elements affects ecological systems.  Particular contributions include global analyses of the nutrient limitation of primary producers, the stoichiometry of nutrient recycling, and the linkage between the phosphorus and RNA content of organisms and their growth rate (the Growth Rate Hypothesis).  This work is summarized in the 2002 book Ecological Stoichiometry, co-authored with Robert Sterner.  Elser has also organized Woodstoich, a series of four workshops on ecological stoichiometry for early career researchers.  The sustainable use of phosphorus is a recent focus, as Director of the Sustainable Phosphorus Alliance

Awards and distinctions 

 1990 Raymond L. Lindeman Award, Association for the Sciences of Limnology and Oceanography
 2008 Fellow, American Association for the Advancement of Science
 2012 G. Evelyn Hutchinson Award, Association for the Sciences of Limnology and Oceanography
 2013 Foreign member, Norwegian Academy of Science and Letters
 2019 Member, National Academy of Sciences USA.

References

External links 

 Homepage
 Google Scholar

1959 births
Living people
American ecologists
American limnologists
Members of the United States National Academy of Sciences
Notre Dame College of Arts and Letters alumni
University of California, Davis alumni
Scientists from Maine
Academics from Portland, Maine
Scientists at University of Notre Dame Environmental Research Center
Members of the Norwegian Academy of Science and Letters